Shell Beach is an unincorporated community in St. Bernard Parish, Louisiana, United States.

Fort Proctor, which is listed on the National Register of Historic Places, is located near Shell Beach.

References

Unincorporated communities in St. Bernard Parish, Louisiana
Unincorporated communities in Louisiana
Unincorporated communities in New Orleans metropolitan area